Shirazi, an adjective meaning "from Shiraz" a city in Iran (Persia), may refer to:

People 
 Demonym for Shiraz, a city in southwestern Iran
 Shirazi people, a subgroup of the Swahili people inhabiting the Swahili Coast
 Abu Ishaq al-Shirazi (1003–1083), a leading Shafi'i scholar who was the first teacher at the Nizamiyya school in Baghdad
 Qutb al-Din al-Shirazi (1236–1311), Persian polymath
 Abdullah Musawi Shirazi (1892–1984), Iranian Grand Ayatollah
 Ali Sayad Shirazi (1944–1999), Iranian general of the Iran-Iraq War
Hasan al-Shirazi (1935–1980), Iranian-Iraqi Ayatollah, and activist
 Kamran Shirazi (born 1952), Iranian International Chess Master
 Lutfullah Khan Shirazi, Mughal faujdar of Kamrup and Sylhet
 Mirza Muhammad-Hassan Shirazi (1815–1895), Iranian-Iraqi grand Ayatollah widely known for his 1891 verdict against the usage of tobacco
Muhammad al-Shirazi (1928–2001), Iranian-Iraqi grand Ayatollah, and author
Muhammad-Ridha al-Shirazi (1958–2008), Iranian-Iraqi Ayatollah
Bagher Shirazi (1936–2007), Iranian-Iraqi professor and architect
 Mu'ayyad fi'l-Din al-Shirazi (1000–1078), 11th-century Persian Isma'ili scholar
Mujtaba al-Shirazi (born 1943), Iranian-Iraqi Ayatollah
 Naser Makarem Shirazi (born 1924), Iranian grand Ayatollah
 Nitzan Shirazi (1971–2014), Israeli footballer and manager
 Sadr al-Din Muhammad al-Shirazi or Mulla Sadra (1571–1636), Persian philosopher and theologian
Sadiq al-Shirazi (born 1942), Iranian-Iraqi grand Ayatollah
Razi Shirazi (born 1927), Iranian-Iraqi grand Ayatollah
 Báb (Sayyid `Alí Muḥammad Shírází, 1819–1850), founder of Bábism and a central figure in the Bahá'í Faith
 Firuzabadi, also known as Abu Tahir Majid al-Din Muhammad ibn Ya'qub ibn Muhammad ibn Ibrahim al-Shirizi al-Fairuzabadi

Places 
Shirazi, Kenya
Shirazi, Iran
Shirazi-ye Olya, Iran
Shirazi-ye Sofla, Iran
Shirazi-ye Vosta, Iran

Other uses 

Afro-Shirazi Party, a former political party in Zanzibar
Shirazi era, a mythic origin in the history of Southeast Africa
Shirazi salad, an Iranian salad
Shirazi, another name for the Persian cat breed

See also 
 Shiraz (disambiguation)

Iranian-language surnames